Julia Boutros (born April 1, 1968) is a Lebanese singer who rose to prominence in the 1980s with a series of songs like "Ghabet Shams El Haq" and "Wein el Malayeen". She is also the sister of Ziad Boutros and the wife of the ex-Minister of defense Elias Bou Saab.

Biography
Boutros was born in Beirut, Lebanon, on April 1, 1968. Her father is originally from Lebanon, while her mother is from Palestine, with an Armenian background. She was educated at the Rosary Sisters Schools where she sang in the school choir. Growing up, she and her brother were heavily influenced by Ziad Rahbani's works. When she was 12 years old she recorded her first song, entitled "A Maman", at Elias Al Rahbani studios. This was introduced to her by her music teacher Fouad Fadel. She also recorded two songs,  "C'est la Vie" & "Viens dans Ma Vie". 

On October 11, 2006, she announced a new single called "Ahibaii" (Dearly Beloved). The lyrics are based on a letter sent by Hezbollah secretary-general Hassan Nasrallah to the fighters in South Lebanon during the 2006 Summer War between Hezbollah and Israel. The poet Ghassan Matar adapted the original text. The music is composed by Ziad, brother of Julia and arranged by Michel Fadel. The profits from the song's sale went to help the families of Hezbollah fighters and to all Lebanese who died during the Israel-Lebanon conflict. Sales eventually garnered three million dollars for the families of the Lebanese civilians, soldiers, security forces, and Hezbollah fighters who have been killed in the Israel-Lebanon conflict. The sum was triple the original aim, which was only one million dollars. The families of Lebanese soldiers killed during operation Naher el-Bared also received a portion of the money. 

Besides support for Hezbollah she has also given her support for Palestinian armed groups in Gaza with the song "Al-Haq Silahi" (Righteousness Is My Weapon) and for the Syrian President Bashar al-Assad.

Awards 

 National order of the cedar, 2007

Discography

Albums
 1982 : C'est La Vie (This is the Life)
 1985 : Ghabet Shams El Haq (The Sun of Justice Has Gone)
 1987 : Wain Msafer (Where Are You Travelling To?)
 1989 : Haflet Sour 
 1991 : Hikayet Aatab (A Story of Lament)
 1994 : Kosass (Stories)
 1996 : Al Karar (The Decision)
 1998 : Shi Gharib (Something Weird)
 2001 : Bisaraha (Honestly)
 2004 : La B'ahlamak (Never in Your Dreams)
 2006 : Ta'awadna Aaleik (We're Used to You)
 2010 : Live at Casino Du Liban (+DVD)
 2012 : Yawman Ma (Someday)
 2012 : Miladak (Your Christmas)
 2013 : Julia Live at Platea (+DVD)
 2014 : Hkayet Watan (The Story of a Country)
 2015 : Julia Live in Concert - Platea 2014 (+DVD)
 2016 : Ana Meen (Who am I?)
 2017 : Julia Live at Waterfront City Dbayeh 2016 (+DVD)
 2019 : Julia Live in Tyre 2018 (+DVD)

Music videos

 Ghabet Shams El Haq (The Sun of Justice Has Gone)
 Nadani W Albi Mal (He Called Me and My Heart Fell)
 Wayn Msafer (Where Are You Travelling To?)
 Kermalak (For You)
 Lamma Elta'ayna (When We Met)
 Ana Mesh Elak (I'm Not Yours)
 Ya Ossas (Stories)
 Wa'ef Ya Zaman (Time Can You Stop)
 Chi Gharib (Something Weird)
 Ala Zaw'ak (As You Please)
 Nasheed El Horriyeh (The Hymn of Freedom)
 La B'ahlamak (Never in Your Dreams)
 Aala Shou (What For?!)
 Betnaffas Horriyeh (I Breathe Freedom)
 Ahiba'i (Dearly Beloved)
 Sou' Tafahom (A Misunderstanding)
AL Hakku Sila7i (My right is my weapon)

References

External links

1968 births
Living people
Lebanese people of Palestinian descent
Lebanese people of Armenian descent
21st-century Lebanese women singers
Musicians from Beirut
Eastern Orthodox Christians from Lebanon
Lebanese Christians
Performers of Christian music in Arabic
20th-century Lebanese women singers